Deathstar (Also written as DeathStar) is multidirectional shooter for the Acorn Electron and BBC Micro developed by Peter Johnson and originally published in the UK by Superior Software in 1985. It is a clone of the arcade game Sinistar.

Gameplay

The player uses four keys, two to rotate the ship (which is always moving forwards), one for fire and one to launch a starbomb. Firing can destroy both enemy workers and warriors, but only a starbomb can be used against the eponymous Deathstar itself. Collisions with workers, warriors or asteroids (referred to in the instructions as planetoids) do not harm the player.

The job of the workers is to build the Deathstar by transporting crystals to it, whilst the job of the warriors is to mine the crystals and also defend the Deathstar by attacking the player. The initial objective is to keep on firing at the asteroids until they start to shed crystals, which are then picked up in order to score points, but more importantly the crystals are converted into starbombs. The starbombs are ultimately used against the Deathstar, once the workers have finished constructing it. The player must successfully defeat the Deathstar to progress into the Worker Zone which has very few planetoids, with a bonus screen between each zone.

The game employs 16-way scrolling over a multi-coloured starfield and runs at a fast rate on both the BBC Micro and Acorn Electron hardware.

Despite the inferior hardware of the Acorn Electron, the in-game sound can be improved up to BBC Micro standards with the addition of Project Expansions' Sound Cartridge.

Development

Originally, the game was to be published by Atarisoft as an official port of the arcade version under its original name, Sinistar. However, the Atarisoft brand was dropped in 1984 and Atari decided to pull out of the Acorn computer market altogether whilst a number of games were still under development.

The game was instead renamed Deathstar and a new title screen designed, allowing it to be released as an unofficial clone by Superior Software in 1985. The game was released shortly after another popular game Repton and is regarded as being part of a successful run of titles from Superior Software in a short space of time.

The then-renamed Deathstar was first published solely by Superior Software in 1985 and later re-released in 1989 by Superior Software and Blue Ribbon as a budget title. The game also appeared on the Beau Jolly compilations Five Star Games and 10 Computer Hits 4, and Superior Software's own Superior Collection compilations (vol 2 on the BBC, vol 3 on the Electron). A cheat loader program for the game was also published in 1988 by Impact Software on the compilation Cheat it again Joe 1. An in-built cheat was discovered to have been left in the BBC version of the game and was published in the March 1989 edition of Micro User magazine.

Deathstar was prominently advertised with full-page dedicated ads in various Acorn-related publications of the 1980s and was also reviewed in magazines such as Acorn User and Electron User. In the 21st century, Deathstar was again reviewed in the 2009 book The 8-Bit Book - 1981 to 199x by Jerry Ellis, published by Hiive books.

A similar title Mega Apocalypse also for the BBC Micro, was due to be released by Martech Games Ltd, but was ultimately abandoned half-finished in 1988.

Speech chip support

The Sinistar arcade game uses sampled speech, which is beyond the abilities of standard BBC Micro and Electron hardware. The BBC Micro has a speech synthesiser chip available as an official add-on, but it has a limited vocabulary. Users who played with this hardware would hear the speech chip say "R, R, R, I an complete" (using the letter "R" repeated for the laugh, and "an" instead of "am"), though this is not a line from the arcade original. Programmer Peter Johnson said at the time "I knew very few gamers would have that speech chip fitted, but I would have loved to see the expression of surprise on their faces the first time they heard the DeathStar speak."

Reception
Roland Waddliove, writing in Electron User magazine stated that "DEATHSTAR is a super fast, all-action arcade classic", "it's the sort of game that you can't put down" and "you've got to have just one more go". Martin Reed also in Electron User described the game as "an excellent conversion" and "a great blast".

The Electron User Group describe the game as "furiously fast", "supremely playable" and as having "a large playing window", whilst the Monkey's Brain website describes the game as "another top-quality arcade conversion". Oliver Robinson on the bbcmicrogames.com website describes the game as "almost arcade perfect" and as "an example of how well the BBC could replicate fast paced, action arcade games".

Game programmer Jason Sobell stated that he "liked Peter Johnson's DeathStar", pointing out the similarity to the game Asteroids.

The game was given a BJ score of 92% on the Five Star Games compilation, although this rating was awarded by Beau Jolly themselves, the publisher of the compilation and therefore can not be considered to originate from a neutral source.

Since the end of the BBC Micro commercial era, some players using emulation have expressed a preference for playing the Acorn Electron version over the BBC Micro version, because it uses keys 'Z' and 'X' to rotate the spacecraft rather than 'CAPS LOCK' and 'left-CTRL' which are vertically aligned on many modern-day keyboards.

References

External links
 Game cover for original Superior Software BBC Micro release at the centre for computing history

1985 video games
BBC Micro and Acorn Electron games
BBC Micro and Acorn Electron-only games
Multidirectional shooters
Superior Software games
Video game clones
Video games developed in the United Kingdom
Single-player video games